"Love Me So" is the only single by English-Irish boy band Stereo Kicks. It was written by band member Tom Mann and was released in the United Kingdom on 21 June 2015 through James Grant Music.

On 27 June, the song debuted at number 31 on the UK Singles Chart after selling 15,755 copies, though it was the week's number-one physical single. Just two weeks later, however, Stereo Kicks announced their break-up.

Music video
The official lyric video was uploaded on 20 April 2015, and the official music video was released on 6 May. On 21 May, Stereo Kicks released an acoustic rap version of the song on Vevo and YouTube.

Track listing
Digital download

 "Love Me So" - 3:29

Charts

Release history

References

2015 songs
2015 debut singles
English pop songs